Dixons was a department store that opened in Southend, England, in 1913 and shut its doors 60 years later in 1973.

History

J. F. Dixon, a draper from Upper Norwood opened his own drapery store in 1913. The Southend store was located on the corner of London Road and what was called The Broadway, now known as the High Street with its main competitors being Keddies & Brightwells. J.F.Dixon was the son of a draper, John Dixon who ran his own drapery business in Gainsborough and Stoke Newington. J.F Dixon bought his father's business in Gainsborough in 1932. The Southend store was re-developed under the design of architect Mr Grover, who had previously designed the Southend stores of Garons and Ravens, which was completed in 1938, including building on the site of the former Theatre Deluxe and had over 40,000 square feet in total. The store was modernised with escalators at the cost of £25,000 in 1956. In 1963 the business joined the 5 day opening movement, closing on Wednesdays and opening until 8 p.m. on Fridays. The store opened a new department aimed at younger females in 1968 called Tomorrow's Girl on the first floor. During the 60s, Dixons was innovative with its advertising having mannequins on display in glass boxes in Southend High Street. The Southend and Gainsborough businesses was closed voluntary by John F. Dixon in 1973 and 1972. Dixon himself would lead the fundraising for the Palace Theatre trust in 1980, and the new studio was named Dixon Studio after him.

The buildings today

The store's buildings were purchased by the Hammerson group in 1974 and split into three retail units. It is today occupied by WHSmith, Burger King, Toy n Tuck (Queens Road) and the Lawrence Matthews Art Shop (Queens Road). J F Dixons was not related to Dixons Retail (now Dixons Carphone Warehouse), also started in Southend.

References

Dixons J L
Department stores in Southend-On-Sea (town)
Buildings and structures in Southend-on-Sea
1913 establishments in England
Retail companies established in 1913
Department store buildings in the United Kingdom
Retail companies disestablished in 1973
British companies disestablished in 1973